The cycling competition at the 1993 European Youth Summer Olympic Days was held from 18 to 20 July. The events took place in Valkenswaard, Netherlands. Boys born 1978 or 1979 or later participated in the event.

Medal summary

References

1993 European Youth Summer Olympic Days
1993
1993 in Dutch sport
1993 in cycle racing